George McHardy was a Scottish professional footballer who played as a centre-half.

References

Scottish footballers
Association football defenders
Strathmore F.C. (Dundee) players
Dundee F.C. players
Grimsby Town F.C. players
English Football League players
Year of birth missing